These are the official results of the Women's 800 metres event at the 2003 IAAF World Championships in Paris, France. There were a total number of 41 participating athletes, with five qualifying heats, three semi-finals and the final held on Tuesday 26 August 2003 at 20:50h.

Final

Semi-final
Held on Sunday 24 August 2003

Heats
Held on Sunday 24 August 2003

See also
Athletics at the 2003 Pan American Games - Women's 800 metres

References

 

H
800 metres at the World Athletics Championships
2003 in women's athletics